Nanfaxin Area is an area and a town in western Shunyi District, Beijing, China. It borders Mapo Town and Shuangfeng Subdistrict to its north, Wangquan Subdistrict and Renhe Town to its east, Capital Airport Subdistrict to its south, Houshayu and Gaoliying Towns to its west. The 2020 Chinese census counted 54,195 residents for the area.

The settlement here used to be called Faxin Village, named after the two dominant families, Fa (法) and Xin (信), within the region. During the Ming dynasty, many villagers moved north and established another Faxin Village, so this region was renamed Nanfaxin to avoid confusion.

History

Administrative divisions 

In 2021, Nanfaxin Area was made up of 17 subdivisions, in which 1 was a community and 16 were villages:

Gallery

See also 

 List of township-level divisions of Beijing

References 

Shunyi District
Towns in Beijing
Areas of Beijing